Bogahakumbura (බෝගහකුඹුර in Sinhala language) is a rural town in Sri Lanka. It is located in Badulla District of Uva Province, Sri Lanka. Majority of people in the area are involved with vegetable cultivation.

This town is located between Haputale - Keppetipola main road. Haputale (17 km), Welimada (12 km), Bandarawela (18 km), Nuwaraeliya (26 km) and Diyatalawa(12 km) are closest major towns from Bogahakumbura. Boralanda (6 km), Keppetipola (6 km/7 km) are the closest minor towns for bogahakumbura. The Grama Niladhari Division of the Bogahakumbura is 51.

Bogahakumbura town is rapidly growing town in Welimada Area. Most closer reason for that is large number of vegetable amount cultivated daily and bidding in the town. About 50 lorries are come from Dambulla, Keppetipola, Bandarawela, Marata, Hambantota, Wellawaya, Ampara and some other places to buy vegetables. About 25 vegetable bidding centers are available in the town. Alawathugoda, Wangiyakumbura, Kandepuhulpola, Pahala Ambewela, Gatalagamuwa, Kirindi Ela, Hewanakumbura, Kalabululanda and Alugolla people visit this town daily. Government schools, police station, base hospital, temples, all kinds of shops, banks and post office are available.

Government institutions
There are several government institutes are available in Bogahakumbura city.
Bogahakumbura - Base Hospital 
Telephone (0094) 057 2280 361
Bogahakumbura Police Station
Address - Alawathugoda Rd, Alawathugoda, Bogahakumbura
Telephone (0094)(057) 2281 221
Sub Post Office (90354)
Bank of Ceylon with ATM
Peoples' Bank
Samuddhi Development Bank
Regional Development Bank 
Govijana Seva Center
Bogahakumbura Maha Vidyalaya
Bogahakumbura Muslim Vidyalaya

Grama Niladhari Divisions
Below Grama Niladhari divisions are bounded with Bogahakumbura town
Bibiligamuwa (50J)
Bogahakubura (51)
Kalubululanda (51A)
Kandepuhulpola (51C)
Alawathugoda (51D)
Alugolla (61B)

Places
Udakirinda Vipassana Bhawana Center  is a meditation center closed to Bogahakumbura town. There are about 4 kilometers from the town.
Udamala Mountain  is a peak between Bogahakumbura and Pattipola village. There are about 8 kilometers from the town.
Diyawatanalla Waterfall  is a waterfall closed to Bogahakumbura town. About 2 km to the waterfall from Bogahakumbura. This waterfall is at Alawathugoda village.

Tourist attractions
There are several tourist attractions closed to Bogahakumbura town.
Adisham Bungalow - Haputale (15 km)
Ohiya (17 km)
Horton Plains (25 km)
Nuwaraeliya (26 km)
Hakgala Botanical Garden (22 km)
Bomburu Ella Waterfalls (28 km)
Fox Hill Track - Diyathalawa (18 km)
Boralanda Farm (6 km)
Ambewela (24 km)
18th Railway Tunnel (5 km)
Railway Summit Level (6 km)
Diyawatanalla Waterfall (2 km)

Postal services
Bogahakumbura Sub Post Office 
Postal code 90354
Telephone (0094)(057) 228 0350

External links
Bogahakumbura Area View Video 
Bogahakumbura Maha Vidyalaya  
Temple of Alawathugoda (Sri Wijayawardanaramaya) 
Maha Sanga 
Bogahakumbura Facebook Page 
Jummah Mosque 
BD/Bogahakumbura Muslim Vidyalaya

See also
Towns in Uva

References

Towns in Badulla District